Development studies is an interdisciplinary branch of social science. Development studies is offered as a specialized master's degree in a number of reputed universities around the world. It has grown in popularity as a subject of study since the early 1990s, and has been most widely taught and researched in developing countries and countries with a colonial history, such as the UK, where the discipline originated. Students of development studies often choose careers in international organisations such as the United Nations, World Bank, non-governmental organisations (NGOs), media and journalism houses, private sector development consultancy firms, corporate social responsibility (CSR) bodies and research centers.

Professional bodies

Throughout the world, a number of professional bodies for development studies have been founded:
 Europe: European Association of Development Research and Training Institutes (EADI)
 Latin America: Consejo Latinoamericano de Ciencias Sociales (CLACSO)
 Asia: Asian Political and International Studies Association (APISA)
 Africa: Council for the Development of Social Science Research in Africa (CODESRIA) and Organization for Social Science Research in Eastern and Southern Africa (OSSREA)
 Arabic world: Arab Institutes and Centers for Economic and Social Development Research (AICARDES)

The common umbrella organisation of these association is the Inter-regional Coordinating Committee of Development Associations (ICCDA). In the UK and Ireland, the Development Studies Association is a major source of information for research on and studying in development studies. Its mission is to connect and promote those working on development research.

Disciplines of development studies

Development issues include:

 Adult education
 Area studies
 Anthropology
 Community development
 Demography
 Development communication
 Development theory
 Diaspora studies
 Ecology
 Economic development
 Economic History
 Environmental studies
 Geography
 Gender studies
 Governance
 History of economic thought
 Human rights
 Human security
 Indigenous rights
 Industrial relations
 Industrialization
 International business
 International development
 International relations
 Journalism
 Media Studies
 Migration studies
 Partnership
 Peace and conflict studies
 Pedagogy
 Philosophy
 Political philosophy
 Population studies
 Postcolonialism
 Psychology
 Public administration
 Public health
 Rural development
 Queer studies
 Sociology
 Social policy
 Social development
 Social work
 Sustainable development
 Urban studies
 Women's studies

History
The emergence of development studies as an academic discipline in the second half of the twentieth century is in large part due to increasing concern about economic prospects for the third world after decolonisation. In the immediate post-war period, development economics, a branch of economics, arose out of previous studies in colonial economics. By the 1960s, an increasing number of development economists felt that economics alone could not fully address issues such as political effectiveness and educational provision. Development studies arose as a result of this, initially aiming to integrate ideas of politics and economics. Since then, it has become an increasingly inter- and multi-disciplinary subject, encompassing a variety of social scientific fields. In recent years the use of political economy analysis- the application of the analytical techniques of economics- to try and assess and explain political and social factors that either enhance or limit development has become increasingly widespread as a way of explaining the success or failure of reform processes. The era of modern development is commonly deemed to have commenced with the inauguration speech of Harry S. Truman in 1949.  In Point Four of his speech, with reference to Latin America and other poor nations, he said:

More than half the people of the world are living in conditions approaching misery. Their food is inadequate. They are victims of disease. Their economic life is primitive and stagnant. Their poverty is a handicap and a threat both to them and to more prosperous areas. For the first time in history, humanity possesses the knowledge and the skill to relieve the suffering of these people.

But development studies has since also taken an interest in lessons of past development experiences of Western countries. More recently, the emergence of human security – a new, people-oriented approach to understanding and addressing global security threats – has led to a growing recognition of a relationship between security and development. Human security argues that inequalities and insecurity in one state or region have consequences for global security and that it is thus in the interest of all states to address underlying development issues. This relationship with studies of human security is but one example of the interdisciplinary nature of development studies.

Global Research cooperation between researchers from countries in the Global North and the Global South, so called North-south research partnerships, allow development studies to consider more diverse perspectives on development studies and other strongly value driven issues. Thus, it can contribute new findings to the field of research.

See also

 Global South Development Magazine
 City development index
 Colonization
 Community development
 Development (disambiguation)
 Development Cooperation Issues    
 Development Cooperation Stories  
 Development Cooperation Testimonials  
 Economic development
 Human rights
 Human security
 Industrialization
 International development
 North-South research partnerships
 Postdevelopment theory
 Social development
 Social work
 Sustainable development
 World-systems theory

References

Further reading
 Breuer, Martin. "Development" (2015). University Bielefeld: Center for InterAmerican Studies.
 Pradella, Lucia and Marois, Thomas, eds. (2015) Polarizing Development: Alternatives to Neoliberalism and the Crisis. Pluto Press.
 Sachs, Wolfgang, ed. (1992) The Development Dictionary: A Guide to Knowledge as Power. Zed Books.

External links 
 Global South Development Magazine 
 Development Studies Internet Resources
 Studying Development – International Development Studies course directory